The following highways are/were numbered 949:

United States